Lieutenant Clement Graham Boothroyd  became an ace during the First World War. He flew as an observer/gunner in a Bristol F.2 Fighter, and in conjunction with his pilots, was credited with 12 confirmed aerial victories.

First World War service
Boothroyd's initial aerial success with 20 Squadron came on 2 July 1918, when he destroyed a Fokker D.VII near Geluwe. On 11 August, he destroyed a kite balloon south of Heule. Then, on 20 September, he began a streak of ten victories that took him through double wins on 23 and 30 October; for this latter pair of double triumphs, he was piloted by fellow ace Capt.Horace Percy Lale. His final tally was: one balloon busted, one Fokker D.VII set afire in mid-air, nine others destroyed in flight, and one sent down out of control.

Post First World War
Boothroyd remained in the service postwar. On 1 August 1920, Observer Officer Clement Graham Boothroyd was Mentioned in Dispatches by General C. C. Monro for exemplary service in Waziristan. On 12 December 1922, Boothroyd transferred to the Class A Reserve. Exactly four years later, he surrendered his commission.

Honors and awards
The citation for his Distinguished Flying Cross reads as follows:

2nd Lieut. Clement Graham Boothroyd.
(FRANCE)
An officer of high courage. On 23 October, after attacking with bombs a railway station the formation with which this officer was flying was engaged with about fifteen enemy scouts; of these, he destroyed one and his pilot accounted for a second. In all he has to his credit eight enemy aircraft and one kite balloon.

References

1899 births
1952 deaths
British World War I flying aces
Royal Air Force personnel of World War I
People from Halifax, West Yorkshire
Recipients of the Distinguished Flying Cross (United Kingdom)
British military personnel of the Waziristan Campaign
Military personnel from Yorkshire